FK Crvena Zemlja (Cyrillic: ФК Црвена Земља) is a football club playing in the village of Nova Ves, Republika Srpska, Bosnia and Herzegovina.

They played one season in the second tier-First League of the Republika Srpska, in 2011-12.

Club seasons

Notable managers
 Mitar Lukić (2010–2011)
 Marko Stojić (2011–2012)

References

Football clubs in Bosnia and Herzegovina
Football clubs in Republika Srpska
1974 establishments in Bosnia and Herzegovina